Anglian may refer to:

 Anglian, meaning "of the Angles",  a Germanic people who settled in Britain in the post-Roman period
 Anglian, a group of dialects of Old English
 Anglian automobile, an English tricar manufactured from 1905 to 1907
 Anglian College London, a college of further and higher education in Woolwich, England
 Anglian Combination, an English football league in Norfolk and northern Suffolk
 Anglian Home Improvements, a British home improvement company
 Anglian Sovereign, a 2003 large sea-going tugboat
 Anglian stage, the name used in the British Isles for a middle Pleistocene glaciation
 Anglian Tower, an Early Medieval tower on the city walls of York, England
 Anglian Water,  a water company that operates in the East of England
 East Anglia, an area in the East of England
 Royal Anglian Regiment, an infantry regiment of the British Army

See also
 Anglicanism, a tradition within Christianity
 Anglic (disambiguation)